The 2016 Prince Edward Island Scotties Tournament of Hearts, the provincial women's curling championship of Prince Edward Island, was held from January 15 to 18 at the Montague Curling Club in Montague, Prince Edward Island. The winning Suzanne Birt rink represented Prince Edward Island at the 2016 Scotties Tournament of Hearts in Grande Prairie, Alberta.

Teams

Knockout Draw Brackets

A Event

B Event

C Event

Playoffs
Birt must be defeated twice.

Semifinal
Monday, January 18, 9:00 am

Final
Monday, January 18, 2:00 pm

External links
Official site

2016 Scotties Tournament of Hearts
Curling competitions in Prince Edward Island
Montague, Prince Edward Island
2016 in Prince Edward Island